The 1964 Harvard Crimson football team was an American football team that represented Harvard University during the 1964 NCAA University Division football season. Harvard finished second in the Ivy League.

In their eighth year under head coach John Yovicsin, the Crimson compiled a 6–3 record and outscored opponents 131 to 123. John F. O’Brien was the team captain.

Harvard's 5–2 conference record was the second-best in the Ivy League standings. The Crimson outscored Ivy opponents 90 to 85.

Harvard played its home games at Harvard Stadium in the Allston neighborhood of Boston, Massachusetts.

Schedule

References

Harvard
Harvard Crimson football seasons
Harvard Crimson football
1960s in Boston